This article contains a list of trade unions in Belgium.

In Belgium, trade unions are organised along politico-denominational lines, following the pillarisation in Belgian society. Therefore, the three major trade unions are all confederations, each adhering to a particular religion or ideology, namely Christian (Catholic), Socialist and Liberal. Each confederation cuts across industry boundaries, having members working in many different sectors. Only the liberal federation, however, has no subsidiary trade unions.

List of federations

References 

Belgium
Trade unions